Lethal Enforcers 3, known as Seigi no Hero (セイギノヒーロー or 正義のヒーロー—Heroes of Justice) in Japan, is a 3D arcade light gun game which is the third and final installment to Konami's Lethal Enforcers series. This installment is produced by Shigenobu Matsuyama.

Gameplay
Lethal Enforcers 3 has players play as six different law enforcement roles in various scenarios in present-day Tokyo, Japan. Players make their way towards checkpoints while shooting criminals, terrorists, or fugitives. Weapons such as submachine guns, shotguns, sniper rifles, and assault rifles are also available during each mission.

Like Konami's earlier Warzaid/World Combat, players point and/or shoot outside the screen to deploy their shields. Raising the shield allows players to protect themselves from incoming enemy fire at the expense of an inability to advance towards the goal.

Unlike previous installments, players can compete with each other in making their way to checkpoints in various areas, in addition to capturing wanted criminals and earning promotions. Also, players do not lose lives when they shoot innocent civilians, instead they face being demoted.

Much of the game's gameplay, music and mannerisms are reminiscent of Police 911, so much to the point where it could be considered a quasi-sequel.

Scenarios
Lethal Enforcers 3/Seigi no Hero allows players to play the stages in the order they desire (with the exception of the Diet Building a.k.a. "Lethal Enforcers 3/Seigi no Hero" stage).  With the exception of the Cops in the City stage, players have access to a 10-round Glock handgun as a standard munition.  There are 6 stages in all.

 In the first stage "Cops in The City" ( in Japan), the players play as Tokyo Metro Police Officers to stop an armed robbery spree in Akihabara.
 In the second stage "Coast Intruders" ( in Japan), the players play as Japan Coast Guards to stop Dragonhead (Ryuto) Drug Dealers from entering Shinagawa Port illegally.
 In the third stage "Rival Heat" ( in Japan), the players play as rival detectives from Tokyo's Police to stop a subway gun smuggling spree operated by Gokudo-Kai Executives.
 In the fourth stage "Airport 2004" ( in Japan), the players play as SIT Mobile Troops to quell violent mysterious radicals at the Narita International Airport.
 In the fifth stage "Justice & Judgment" ( in Japan), the players play as JGSDF soldiers and Special Forces Group commandos to stop foreign terrorists from blowing up a nuclear power plant.
 In the last stage "Lethal Enforcers 3" (Seigi No Hero in Japan), the players play as SAT Operatives to stop a coup d'état orchestrated by a rogue JGSDF Kanto Regiment in the Diet Building.

Trivia
 All Asian hostiles are named after either Konami's veteran employees or those who developed the video game (Man Tak Wah was credited as Addison Man in the English translation of the video game).
 The game is spoken entirely in Japanese throughout gameplay (i.e. when players lose a life, the announcer will say "Player junshoku" (殉職) or "Player died on duty")—this was the case in The Keisatsukan and The Keisatsukan 2.  The reason is to simulate the players' experience working as a Japanese authority.
 The JGSDF soldiers the player play as in Justice and Judgment and the enemies in the Diet Building are not related to each other, as the enemies in the Diet Building are from a JGSDF's Coupists join the coup d'état and thrust 12 demands to the Prime Minister, while the Special Forces Group is a special forces unit who doubles as the JGSDF's counter-terrorist unit, a reason why players do not see the JGSDF soldiers during the end credits.
 The police woman (seen in the title screen and in the cabinet) is a hidden character players have to unlock by an unknown code.

External links 
Official Japanese Site
GameFAQs

2004 video games
Arcade video games
Arcade-only video games
Konami games
Light gun games
Rail shooters
Video games about police officers
Video games about terrorism
Video games set in 2004
Video games set in 2005
Video games set in Tokyo
Polygon Magic games
Konami arcade games
Video games developed in Japan